Dieveniškės Regional Park, established in 1992, covers  in southeastern Lithuania near the city of Šalčininkai. Its natural and cultural features include Bėčionys castle mound, the Norviliškės monastery complex, and geologic formations. Much of the village of Dieveniškės lies within its territory.

References

  . Seimas of the Republic of Lithuania.
 . Šalčininkai district municipality official website.

Regional parks of Lithuania
Tourist attractions in Vilnius County